Ramona Wulf (born 18 October 1954) is a German singer. Her biggest success as a solo singer was in 1971 with the song Alles was wir woll'n auf Erden which reached number 8 on the German single charts. She was the public face of Silver Convention from 1974 to 1979. 

"Fly, Robin, Fly", released by Silver Convention as the third single from Save Me in September 1975, reached number one on the United States Billboard Hot 100.

After the dissolution of Silver Convention in 1979, she worked as a solo singer but only saw moderate success.

Wulf's mother was German and her father was an African-American soldier in the US Armed Forces.

See also 

 Silver Convention

References

20th-century German women
21st-century German women
1954 births
Living people
German women singers
Silver Convention members